The men's 100 metre freestyle event at the 2012 Summer Olympics took place on 31 July and 1 August at the London Aquatics Centre in London, United Kingdom. There were 56 competitors from 49 nations. The event was won by Nathan Adrian of the United States.

Summary
In one of the closest finishes in Olympic history, Nathan Adrian touched out Australia's favorite James Magnussen at the wall by a fingertip to win the event at the Olympics for the Americans for the first time since Matt Biondi topped the podium in 1988. Coming from third at the halfway turn, Adrian powered home on the final stretch, finishing in 47.52 to edge out Magnussen, also known as "The Missile", by a hundredth of a second (0.01). Meanwhile, Magnussen won a second straight silver for the Aussies in 47.53, adding more than four tenths of a second from his best time of 47.10 at the 2012 Australian Championships. Canada's Brent Hayden picked up the bronze in 47.80, winning his first Olympic medal and handing the Canadians their first ever medal in the event's history.

After claiming two golds and a silver in the past four days, France's Yannick Agnel could not produce his similar effort with a fourth-place time in 47.84. Meanwhile, Netherlands' Sebastiaan Verschuren pulled off a fifth-place finish in 47.88. Heading into the halfway turn with an early lead, Brazil's world record holder César Cielo dropped to sixth in 47.92. Cuba's Hanser García (48.04) and Russia's Nikita Lobintsev (48.44) rounded out a historic finale.

Background
This was the twenty-sixth appearance of the men's 100 metre freestyle. The event has been held at every Summer Olympics except 1900 (when the shortest freestyle was the 200 metres), though the 1904 version was measured in yards rather than metres.

Two of the eight finalists from the 2008 Games returned: bronze medalist César Cielo of Brazil and eighth-place finisher Stefan Nystrand of Sweden. The favorite coming into the event was James Magnussen of Australia, the 2011 world champion and textile-suit world best holder. Cielo had been the 2009 world champion; his world record (set in a skinsuit) still stands as of 2020. Canadian Brent Hayden was the runner-up in the 2011 world championships. French relay anchor Yannick Agnel was also a contender.

Grenada, Mali, Paraguay, Tanzania, and Turkmenistan each made their debut in the event. The United States made its 25th appearance, most of any nation, having missed only the boycotted 1980 Games.

Qualification

Each National Olympic Committee (NOC) could enter up to two swimmers if both met the Olympic Qualifying Time (or "OQT"). An NOC with no swimmers meeting the OQT but at least one swimmer meeting the Olympic Selection Time (or "OST") was not guaranteed a place, but was eligible for selection to fill the overall 900 swimmer quota for the Games. For 2012, the OQT was 48.82 seconds while the OST was 50.53 seconds. The qualifying window was 1 March 2011 to 3 July 2012; only approved meets (generally international competitions and national Olympic trials) during that period could be used to meet the standards. There were also universality places available; if no male swimmer from a nation qualified in any event, the NOC could enter one male swimmer in an event.

Eight nations (Australia, Brazil, the Cayman Islands, France, Italy, Russia, South Africa, and the United States) had two swimmers meet the OQT. Five more (Canada, Cuba, Germany, the Netherlands, and Poland) had one swimmer qualify through the OQT. 18 NOCs received a place through OST selection. 21 nations used universality places in the men's 100 metre freestyle.

The two swimmers per NOC limit had been in place since the 1984 Games.

Competition format

This freestyle swimming competition consisted of three rounds: heats, semifinals, and a final. The swimmers with the best 16 times in the heats advanced to the semifinals. The swimmers with the best 8 times in the semifinals advanced to the final. Swim-offs were used as necessary to break ties for advancement to the next round.

Records

Prior to this competition, the existing world and Olympic records were as follows.

No new world or Olympic records were set during the competition. It was the first Olympics where non-textile suits were banned.

Schedule

The competition returned to a two-day schedule, with heats and semifinals on the same day.

All times are British Summer Time (UTC+1)

Results

Heats

Semifinals

Final

References

External links
NBC Olympics Coverage

Men's 00100 metre freestyle
2012 Summer Olympics
Men's events at the 2012 Summer Olympics